Taipei Detention Center, Agency of Corrections, Ministry of Justice commonly known as the Tucheng Detention Center. In 1952 on July 1 the Taiwan Taipei Detention Center was separated from the Taiwan Taipei Prison its official name changed to “Detention Center of the Taipei District Court, Taiwan.” In 1975 it was relocated toTucheng District, New Taipei City. Many political prisoners were held here and it became known as the "First Lockup Under Heaven.”

Notable detainees 

 Chi Chia-wei the LGBT rights activist was incarcerated here for approximately 6 months in 1986 after requested that the Legislative Yuan allow him to marry his boyfriend.
 Chen Shui-bian future president of Taiwan was detained here in 1986 as a political prisoner. He also referred to detention center as the Bastille, and asked for his grandchildren to be told he had gone to Robben Island.

References

Buildings and structures in New Taipei
Prisons in Taiwan